The glossy-mantled manucode (Manucodia ater) is a species of bird-of-paradise.

The glossy-mantled manucode was the first bird of paradise encountered by the French naturalist René-Primevère Lesson, the first westerner to see live wild birds of paradise.

Subspecies
 Manucodia ater ater (mainland New Guinea)
 Manucodia ater subalter (West Papuan Islands, Aru Is, and SE peninsula of New Guinea)

Distribution
It is widely distributed throughout the lowlands of New Guinea and nearby islands. Widespread and common throughout its large range, the glossy-mantled manucode is evaluated as least concern on the IUCN Red List of Threatened Species. It is listed on Appendix II of CITES.

Habitat
The glossy-mantled manucode live in lowland rainforest, riverine and monsoon forests, forest edge, swamp-forest and woodlands.

Description

The glossy-mantled manucode is medium-sized, around 42 cm long, glossed green, blue and purple black with a red iris, black bill, long graduated tail and somewhat elongated upper breast and neck feathers. Both sexes are similar. The female is a slightly smaller than the male. In appearance, the glossy-mantled manucode resembles and is difficult to distinguish from its nearest relatives, the crinkle-collared and jobi manucodes.

Biology
These birds have diurnal habits. They tend to move alone or in pairs, rarely in small groups: They spend most of their time looking for food among the branches of trees, ready to hide themselves in the thick vegetation when disturbed. They are not particularly timid, but it is easier to hear their calls or flights rather than observe them directly. The diet consists mainly of fruits, figs and arthropods.

Bibliography
 Beehler, B. M. (1989), "The birds of paradise", Scientific American, vol.261, p. 116-123.
 Clench, Mary H. 1978. Trachael Elongation in Birds-of-Paradise. Condor 80 (4): 423–430.
 Frith, C. B. & Frith, D. W. (2009), « Family Paradisaeidae (Birds of Paradise) », In del Hoyo, J. Elliott, A. & Christie, D. Handbook of the Birds of the World. Bush-shrikes to Old World Sparrows, vol.14, p. 404-459. Lynx Edicions, Barcelona.
 Frith, C. B.; Beehler, B. M. 1998. The birds of paradise. Oxford University Press, Inc., New York.
 Gilliard, E. T. (1969), Birds of paradise and Bowerbirds, Weidenfeld & Nicolson, New York.
 Ottaviani, M. (2012), Les Oiseaux de Paradis – Histoire Naturelle et photographies, 320 pages. Editions Prin, France.
 Sibley, C. G.; Monroe, B. L. 1990. Distribution and taxonomy of birds of the world. Yale University Press, New Haven, USA.

References

External links

 BirdLife Species Factsheet 
 Oiseaux.net

glossy-mantled manucode
Birds of New Guinea
glossy-mantled manucode
Taxa named by René Lesson